The Strange Death of Adolf Hitler is a 1943 American war film directed by James P. Hogan. The film follows a man who plans to murder Adolf Hitler and steal his identity.

Plot
Franz Huber (Ludwig Donath), an Austrian actor known for his impersonations of celebrities, is captured by the Gestapo and forced to undergo plastic surgery to become a stand-in for Adolf Hitler. The conspirators are planning to poison Hitler and put Huber in his place – and under their control. Huber is able to foil the Gestapo and strike a blow for democracy; but his life is put in danger because his wife (Gale Sondergaard), who is also an anti-Nazi, doesn't know that her missing husband has become a Hitler look-alike.

Cast
Ludwig Donath ... Franz Huber/Adolf Hitler
Gale Sondergaard ... Anna Huber
George Dolenz ... Herman Marbach
Fritz Kortner ... Bauer
Ludwig Stössel ... Graub
William Trenk ... Colonel Von Zechwitz
Joan Blair ... Duchess Eugenie
Ivan Triesault ... Prince Hohenberg
Rudolph Anders ... Major Mampe
Ernő Verebes ... Count Godeck
Merrill Rodin ... Hans Huber
Charles Bates ... Viki Huber
Kurt Katch ... Colonel Karl Frobe
Hans Schumm ... Major Profe
Frederick Giermann ... Heinrich Himmler
Richard Ryen ... General Palzer
John Mylong ... General Halder
Kurt Kreuger ... Nazi leader
Lester Sharpe ... Dr. Kaltenbach
Trude Berliner ... Frau Reitler
Hans Heinrich von Twardowski ... Judge
Wolfgang Zilzer ... Attorney

See also
 Hitler's Children
 Hitler – Dead or Alive 
 The Hitler Gang
 Look-alike
 The Strange Death of Adolf Hitler

References

External links

1943 films
Universal Pictures films
Films about Nazi Germany
Films directed by James Patrick Hogan
American black-and-white films
World War II films made in wartime
Cultural depictions of Adolf Hitler
American war films
1943 war films
Films scored by Hans J. Salter
1940s English-language films